Reginald Simpson (1896–1964) was a British stage actor and playwright. He moved to Hollywood where he appeared in around seventy films in a mixture of supporting and minor roles.

Selected filmography
 Wallflowers (1928)
 The Honor of the Press (1932)
 Bird of Paradise (1932)
 Kiss of Araby (1933)
 I Believed in You (1934)
 Fifteen Maiden Lane (1936)
 Find the Witness (1937)
 The Law and Jake Wade (1958)

References

Bibliography
 Mycroft, Walter. Walter C. Mycroft, the Time of My Life: The Memoirs of a British Film Producer. Scarecrow Press, 2006.

External links

1896 births
1964 deaths
British male film actors
British male stage actors
British emigrants to the United States
British writers